Bet Yaakov Synagogue (Hebrew: קהל קדוש בית יעקב) is a synagogue in Istanbul, Turkey that was built in 1878. It is located at the Asian side of the Bosphorus in the area called Kuzguncuk, just beside a Greek Orthodox church. The Jewish population of Kuzguncuk having moved away, it is kept alive by worshippers whose families originated there. Shabbat services on Saturday morning are held regularly.

See also
History of the Jews in Turkey
List of synagogues in Turkey

References and notes

External links
Chief Rabbinate of Turkey
Shalom Newspaper - The main Jewish newspaper in Turkey

Synagogues in Istanbul
Synagogues completed in 1878
Bosphorus
Üsküdar
Synagogues in the Ottoman Empire
1878 establishments in the Ottoman Empire